Captain Timothy Hill House is a historic home located at Chincoteague Island, Accomack County, Virginia. It was built about 1800, and moved to its present location in 1980 when faced with demolition.  It is a -story dwelling that was built using pit sawn and hewn pine planks and measures 17 feet, 4 inches, by 16 feet, 4 inches.  It currently sits on a low brick pier foundation.  It has a modern roof featuring a steep side gable with wood shingles and weatherboard.  The house has a wooden chimney that represents the first period of this house and features carvings of sailing ships of the period on the exterior
log walls.  It is significant as a rare surviving example of log plank construction still existent in Virginia, possibly the oldest remaining house on Chincoteague Island, and one of the few houses remaining in Virginia which at one time had a wood chimney.

It was added to the National Register of Historic Places in 2011.

References

Houses on the National Register of Historic Places in Virginia
National Register of Historic Places in Accomack County, Virginia
Houses in Accomack County, Virginia
Chincoteague, Virginia